Ennio Filonardi (1568–1644) was a Roman Catholic prelate who served as Bishop of Ferentino (1612–1644).

Biography
Ennio Filonardi was born in Verulan in 1568.
On 19 November 1612, he was appointed during the papacy of Pope Paul V as Bishop of Ferentino. On 30 November 1612, he was consecrated bishop by Giovanni Garzia Mellini, Cardinal-Priest of Santi Quattro Coronati with Giovanni Battista Salvago, Bishop of Luni e Sarzana, and Antonio Seneca, Bishop of Anagni, serving as co-consecrators. 
He served as Bishop of Ferentino until his death in 1644.

While bishop, he was the principal co-consecrator of Camillo Moro, Bishop of Termoli (1612); and Alessandro Filonardi, Bishop of Aquino (1615).

References

External links and additional sources
 (for Chronology of Bishops) 
 (for Chronology of Bishops) 

17th-century Italian Roman Catholic bishops
Bishops appointed by Pope Paul V
1568 births
1644 deaths